The Merry Month of May may refer to:

The Merry Month of May (novel), a 1971 novel by James Jones
"The Merry Month of May" (poem), a 16th/17th century poem by Thomas Dekker
The Merry Month of May, a 1955 film featuring Lee Hoi-chuen
"The Merry Month Of May", regimental march of the 10th Royal Hussars
"The Merry Month of May", Irish folksong whose tune was used for the ballad "The Patriot Game"
 "It is the Merry Month of May", a duet from Edward German's operetta Merrie England
"In the merry merry month of May", memorable line from the song "The Fountain in the Park"